Vítor Vieira Belfort (born 1 April 1977) is a Brazilian, retired mixed martial artist who competes in the Heavyweight and Middleweight divisions. Belfort previously competed for the Ultimate Fighting Championship (UFC), where he fought in the Heavyweight, Light Heavyweight and Middleweight divisions. He is the UFC 12 Heavyweight Tournament Champion, as well as the former UFC Light Heavyweight Champion and Cage Rage World Light Heavyweight Champion. Known for his explosive knockout power, Belfort is tied for third for the most finishes in UFC history with 14. Belfort has also competed for MMA promotions Pride FC, Strikeforce, Affliction, and Cage Rage.

Background
Born and raised in Rio De Janeiro, Brazil, Belfort began training in boxing at the age of 12 under Claudio Coelho. Belfort later studied Brazilian jiu-jitsu with Carlson Gracie, who gave him his black belt. Gracie scouted Belfort at the Brazilian National Jiu-Jitsu Championships, where he won the Absolute and Heavyweight titles for blue belts under age 18. Belfort, 17 at the time, was invited to compete at Gracie's gym, where he trained with the likes of Murilo Bustamante, Ricardo Loborio, Ricardo De La Riva, Mario Sperry, and Wallid Ismail.

Mixed martial arts career
At the age of 19, Belfort came to the United States to compete. In his first sanctioned mixed martial arts match, an event called Superbrawl in Hawaii, his opponent was Jon Hess, whom the young Brazilian defeated in 12 seconds by knockout, despite Hess having a seven-inch height advantage and a more than 100-pound weight advantage over Belfort.

Ultimate Fighting Championship
Soon after, he moved on to compete in the UFC, where he was given the nickname The Phenom. He beat two fighters in his debut event in the UFC, winning the UFC 12 Heavyweight Tournament. At age 19, Belfort became the youngest fighter to score a victory inside the octagon. Belfort's next match saw him score a technical knockout (TKO) against the UFC 6 runner-up Tank Abbott in a non-tournament fight, knocking Abbott down and finishing him with a ground and pound attack.

Heavyweight bouts
In 1997 Belfort fought against American Greco-Roman wrestler Randy Couture, the first of three fights they would have. Belfort was upset by TKO 8:16 into the match, his boxing skills negated by Couture's clinch fighting.

After this defeat, he would fight twice more in the UFC. The first of these fights was against a training partner of his, Joe Charles, whom he defeated quickly via armbar without throwing a single punch.

Light heavyweight debut
A year later, Belfort faced rising Brazilian star and future PRIDE Middleweight Champion Wanderlei Silva. Catching Silva early with a left cross, Belfort chased him across the cage with a flurry of punches, knocking Silva out by TKO in just 44 seconds.

PRIDE Fighting Championships / Heavyweight sophomore
Vítor then moved on to fight in Japan's PRIDE Fighting Championships. His first opponent was Kazushi Sakuraba in 1999. Vítor controlled the first minutes of the fight before Sakuraba scored a takedown. He spent the remainder of the fight on his back being stomped and kicked by Sakuraba. Following the fight he stopped training with Carlson Gracie and started to train with Brazilian Top Team.

Light heavyweight sophomore
He fought in PRIDE against Alistair Overeem, Gilbert Yvel, Daijiro Matsui, Bobby Southworth, and Heath Herring. For these matches Belfort used his stand-up striking skills less and instead controlled the fights and won by ground-and-pound tactics, with the exception of his fight with Southworth, which he won via rear-naked choke in the first round. However, in the opening round of the 2005 Middleweight Grand Prix he faced Alistair Overeem, losing via first-round guillotine choke.

Return to the UFC
Returning to the UFC, Belfort was scheduled to fight Tito Ortiz in the main event of UFC's first Las Vegas show at UFC 33. However, he sustained an injury prior to the event, and the bout was cancelled. Belfort eventually returned and fought Chuck Liddell (losing via decision), then Marvin Eastman (winning via TKO and opening a severe cut on Eastman's eyebrow with a knee strike).

Winning and losing the title/Belfort vs. Couture II & III
His next fight was on 31 January 2004, a rematch with Randy Couture for the UFC Light heavyweight Championship. Despite agonizing over his sister Priscila Belfort, who disappeared on 9 January, Vitor won the fight in 49 seconds after a seam from his glove cut Couture's eye, leaving Couture with a corneal abrasion that prompted a referee stoppage. A third match between the two took place on 21 August 2004. Couture won via doctor stoppage after the third round, recapturing the title.

Belfort vs. Ortiz
His next fight in the UFC was against Tito Ortiz on 5 February 2005. The fight was Ortiz's last fight on his contract. Belfort had early success in the first round, landing his best punches when the fight was on the feet, although he was taken down late in the round and took some of Ortiz's best elbows. Belfort again had a strong start in the second but was taken down a second time and took damage from elbows late in the round. Both fighters were exhausted by round 3; Belfort was too tired to land a single punch and was taken down and dominated, with Ortiz again landing damaging elbows. After a hard-fought battle, Belfort lost a close split decision: some people, including then UFC Light heavyweight champion, Chuck Liddell believed he deserved to win the first as well as the second round, due to his octagon control and breaking Ortiz's nose with punches, early in round 1.

Strikeforce
Vitor then fought in Strikeforce for a rematch with Alistair Overeem, in which Belfort was defeated via unanimous decision.

Return to Pride and steroid controversy
At Pride 32: The Real Deal on 21 October 2006, Belfort lost a unanimous decision to Pride Welterweight Champion Dan Henderson. After the fight, Belfort tested positive for an illegal substance, 4-hydroxytestosterone. In his defense, Belfort argued that he had purchased an over the counter supplement which contained 4-Hydroxytestosterone. Belfort also explained that he may have received 4-Hydroxytestosterone as the result of rehabilitative injections given to him by Brazilian endocrinologist Dr. Rodrigo M. Greco after his surgery to repair a torn meniscus in his knee in the summer of 2006. The Nevada State Athletic Commission eventually received a statement from Dr. Greco stating that he did give Belfort post-surgical injections containing testosterone. While conceding that Belfort may have not known about the testosterone, the NSAC explained that even if Belfort was given injections by a medical practitioner who did not inform him that they contained anabolic steroids, it would still be a violation of the banned substances policy. On 21 December 2006, he was suspended for nine months from the date of the hearing and fined $10,000.

Cage Rage
Vítor Belfort defeated Ivan Serati by TKO at Cage Rage 21 in England on 21 April 2007. He defeated James Zikic on 22 September 2007, at Cage Rage 23 to claim the Cage Rage light heavyweight title in a unanimous decision. He entered the fight with a broken hand and during the fight threw minimal punches and utilized takedowns and ground and pound techniques.

Affliction
Vítor spent a brief time training for his Affliction fight against Terry Martin with Chute Boxe in Brazil. However, he completed his preparation for the fight at Xtreme Couture in Las Vegas. Randy Couture and Shawn Tompkins helped train him for the fight, in which he achieved a second-round KO by landing a flying knee and following up with an uppercut straight-left combination.

After the fight, Couture said Belfort was thinking about moving to Las Vegas and training at Xtreme Couture full-time.

Belfort's next fight was slated to be against Matt Lindland at the second Affliction event, however, he was forced to pull out due to a hand injury sustained during the Terry Martin fight. The second Affliction event was postponed anyway and rescheduled for January 2009, enabling Vítor to fight on that card.

With rumours of a possible bout with reigning Dream Middleweight Grand Prix winner Gegard Mousasi circulating, it was announced that Vítor would finally fight Lindland at Affliction: Day of Reckoning. Lindland was originally slated to fight Renato Sobral at a catchweight, but promoters of Affliction preferred the Belfort vs. Lindland fight at Middleweight. The fight ended in a KO at thirty-seven seconds, as Belfort delivered a strong left to Lindland's jaw and followed up with four unanswered power shots as he hit the ground.

Third UFC run

During a press conference, Dana White announced that the UFC had re-signed Belfort to a contract. His first match was against Rich Franklin at a catchweight of 195 lbs, headlining UFC 103, which he won by knockout three minutes and two seconds into the first round.

Middleweight bouts, & Title shot
Belfort was expected to face Anderson Silva for the UFC Middleweight Championship on 2 January 2010, at UFC 108. However, Silva's manager, Ed Soares, announced that Silva would not be fully recovered from his injury by that time, so the fight was postponed. Belfort was again slated to fight Silva on 6 February 2010, at UFC 109 and 10 April 2010, at UFC 112, respectively, but both fights were canceled because of a surgery for Silva and an injury suffered by Belfort. Belfort was scheduled to fight Yushin Okami at UFC 122. However, Dana White tweeted Belfort would instead challenge Silva at UFC 126 for the belt. Belfort lost by knockout after getting hit with a front kick to the face and taking two punches after falling to the mat.

Belfort made his return at UFC 133 against Yoshihiro Akiyama. Belfort initially thought the UFC would try to put him on the card at UFC 134 in Brazil, but the fight with Akiyama came together to help bolster the card in Philadelphia. Belfort contracted Hepatitis A in April, shortly after accepting the fight, but his representative, Pedro Lima, said that it would not jeopardize the bout with Akiyama. Belfort was successful in his return, winning the fight by knockout one minute and fifty-two seconds into the first round.

Belfort was briefly linked to a matchup with Cung Le, expected to take place on 19 November 2011, at UFC 139. However, Belfort was removed from the bout due to injury and replaced by Wanderlei Silva.

Missed weight bout
Belfort faced Anthony Johnson on 14 January 2012, at UFC 142. During the UFC 142 weigh ins, Johnson came in 11 pounds over the 186 lb weight allowance and was fined 20 percent of his earnings. Belfort requested that Johnson not weigh more than 205 lbs the day of the fight. The UFC had Johnson weigh in a second time. Johnson officially weighed in at 204 lbs on fight day, and the fight with Belfort proceeded as scheduled, with Belfort winning via rear naked choke in the first round, his first submission win in over a decade.

The Ultimate Fighter: Brazil
Belfort was selected to coach The Ultimate Fighter: Brazil against Wanderlei Silva. The rematch between Belfort and Silva was expected to take place on 23 June 2012, at UFC 147. However, on 27 May 2012, Belfort was forced to pull out of the bout, citing a broken hand in training, and replaced by Rich Franklin.

In a recent interview, Belfort expressed disinterest in actually fighting Wanderlei Silva. He told Fighters Only magazine, "I guess Wanderlei will be able to fight in October but I only want that my next bout that accredits me to dispute the belt. I don’t know, maybe Michael Bisping. I was only defeated once recently, by Anderson Silva, and all my wins were very convincing." He further stated, "I don’t know how long I will stay in this division. I wanted to do more two or three fights. If my body will no longer permit this big weight cutting, I will go up (to 205 lbs). I am not afraid of Jon Jones or somebody else... It's not for me to choose my opponents."

Third Light heavyweight title shot
Belfort was expected to face Alan Belcher on 13 October 2012, at UFC 153. However, he replaced Lyoto Machida in a bout against Jon Jones at UFC 152 for the UFC Light Heavyweight Championship after Machida rejected the offer due to lack of time to train before the fight. Despite almost submitting Jones via armbar in the first round, he was dominated during the remainder of the bout and submitted via keylock at 0:54 of the fourth round.

Return to Middleweight
Belfort returned to face Michael Bisping on 19 January 2013, at UFC on FX: Belfort vs. Bisping, winning via TKO due to a head kick and punches at 1:27 of the second round. Belfort injured Bispings right eye with his head kick.

Belfort faced the final Strikeforce Middleweight Champion and promotional newcomer Luke Rockhold on 18 May 2013, at UFC on FX: Belfort vs. Rockhold.

Return to Light heavyweight
Belfort faced Dan Henderson at light heavyweight in a rematch on 9 November 2013, at UFC Fight Night 32. Belfort defeated Henderson via first-round knockout to become the first person to defeat Henderson via strikes. The win also earned Belfort his fifth Knockout of the Night bonus award.

Middleweight return
Belfort was expected to face UFC middleweight champion Chris Weidman at UFC 173. However, Belfort chose to withdraw from the fight following the Nevada State Athletic Commission's ban on exemptions for testosterone replacement therapy and was replaced by Lyoto Machida. Subsequently, Belfort revealed that he had failed a random drug test in February, due to elevated levels of testosterone.

Belfort was expected to face Chael Sonnen on 5 July 2014, at UFC 175 as a replacement for Wanderlei Silva. However, Sonnen failed a random drug test and was removed from the bout. The following day it was announced by MMA writer Kevin Iole that Belfort had also been removed from the card due to the inability of the UFC to find him a new opponent.

Belfort was expected to face Weidman on 6 December 2014, at UFC 181. However, on 22 September, it was announced that Weidman had suffered a broken hand and the bout was again rescheduled to take place on 28 February 2015, at UFC 184. In turn, on 30 January 2015, the UFC announced that Weidman had pulled out of the bout again, citing an injury he sustained in training. The bout with Weidman eventually took place on 23 May 2015, at UFC 187. Belfort found initial success with a flurry of punches early in the opening of the first round, but Weidman survived them, secured a takedown, achieved the mount position and defeated Belfort via TKO due to punches.

Belfort faced Dan Henderson in a rubber match at UFC Fight Night 77 on 7 November 2015. He again defeated Henderson via a combination of head kick and punches. The win also earned Belfort his first Performance of the Night bonus award.

Belfort next faced Ronaldo Souza on 14 May 2016, at UFC 198 He lost the fight via TKO in the first round.

A long discussed fight with Gegard Mousasi took place on 8 October 2016, at UFC 204. Belfort lost the fight via TKO in the second round.

Belfort faced Kelvin Gastelum on 11 March 2017, at UFC Fight Night 106. He lost the fight via a combination of punches in the first round resulting in a K.O. However, Gastelum subsequently tested positive for marijuana and the result was overturned to a No Contest.

Belfort faced Nate Marquardt on 3 June 2017, at UFC 212. He won the fight by unanimous decision, his first decision win in nearly a decade.

Belfort was expected to face Uriah Hall on 14 January 2018, at UFC Fight Night: Stephens vs. Choi. However, on 13 January 2018, it was announced that Hall did not make it to the weigh-in because he fainted and suffered seizures from weight-cutting practices and the bout was cancelled.

Belfort faced Lyoto Machida on 12 May 2018, at UFC 224. He lost the fight after being knocked out by a front kick to the face. Following the fight, Belfort announced his retirement from MMA competition.

On Monday 17 December 2018, Vitor Belfort announced his intentions to return from retirement on the Helwani Show.

ONE Championship 
On March 1, 2019, it was reported that Belfort signed by ONE Championship. On April 28, 2020, Belfort announced that he will be making his promotional debut against Alain Ngalani. Belfort has since parted ways with ONE Championship without fighting for the promotion.

Grappling

ADCC Championships 
In 2001 Belfort participated in the ADCC championships, in their Absolute division. Prior to that competition he had already faced Hiroki Fukuda, winning by submission, and Mark Robinson, losing by points. In the championship Belfort faced Genki Sudo, winning by points, Ricco Rodriguez, winning by points, Ricardo Arona in the semi-final, losing by points and finally in the 3rd place fight defeating Ricardo Almeida by advantage after Almeida was unable to continue due to an injury to his knee, winning the bronze medal.

Boxing career

Neves vs. Belfort 
On 11 April 2006, Belfort made his professional boxing debut against Josemario Neves. Belfort won by TKO within the first minute after knocking his opponent down three times. This has been his sole venture into the sport of professional boxing so far.

Belfort has expressed a desire to return to professional boxing, stating in 2008 that he was interested in talking with Golden Boy Promotions regarding a deal. In 2010, in response to former IBA Heavyweight Champion James Toney's challenge to fight an MMA fighter in the boxing ring, Belfort expressed interest in representing the sport of MMA against Toney in a 6-round professional match. James Toney, however, went on to be defeated in the UFC Octagon by Randy Couture at UFC 118.

Holyfield vs. Belfort

In early June 2021, Triller announced that Belfort would face YouTuber Michael "The Real Tarzann" Holston in a professional boxing bout on June 19, 2021. However, the bout was cancelled due to unknown reasons.

On June 17, 2021, it was reported that Belfort had agreed to an exhibition boxing match with former six-division boxing world champion Oscar De La Hoya in September 2021, which will be promoted by Triller. In July, news surfaced that the bout was changed to a professional boxing bout and was set to take place on September 11, 2021.

On September 3, De La Hoya announced that he would not be fighting Belfort due to contracting COVID-19. In a message to his fans, he stated that he was fully vaccinated and receiving hospital treatment. In turn, it was announced that former heavyweight champion Evander Holyfield will be stepping in to face Belfort and that the event was being moved from California to Florida. Belfort won the exhibition match via technical knockout.

Rahman Jr. vs. Belfort
On August 27, 2022, DAZN announced that Belfort would be boxing professional heavyweight Hasim Rahman Jr. in the main event of MF & DAZN: X Series 002 on October 15, 2022, in Sheffield, England. The bout was postponed to MF & DAZN: X Series 003 on November 19, 2022, and was expected to take place at the Moody Center in Austin, Texas. Belfort withdrew from the fight after testing positive for COVID-19

Belfort vs. Jacare

Belfort was booked to compete against fellow MMA veteran Ronaldo 'Jacare' Souza in a professional boxing match at Gamebred Boxing 4 on April 1, 2023.

Personal life
Belfort was born on 1 April 1977, in Rio de Janeiro to a French-Brazilian father and a Greek-Brazilian mother. He is married to Joana Prado, with whom he has three children. They started dating in 2000 and broke up, but reunited during a reality show in 2002. The same year, Belfort appeared with Joana when she was photographed for the Brazilian edition of Playboy.

On 9 January 2004, Belfort's sister, Priscila, disappeared and the relatives received no information about her. In August 2007, a woman identified as Elaine Paiva confessed that she participated in her kidnapping and killing, and that she was kidnapped to pay off a four thousand dollar debt Paiva had with drug dealers. Paiva was arrested along with three others alleged to be involved in the kidnapping. The group allegedly buried her body in the woods in Rio de Janeiro where police conducted searches, but her remains have never been found. Her family however does not accept this version of events, and believes that Priscila is still alive somewhere. Belfort still maintains a missing page on the Brazilian version of his website.

Belfort speaks Portuguese, English, and Spanish. He is a devout Christian. Belfort believes the most important key to his success and longevity in the sport is that he is happy with what he does. "I just thank God every day. I’m happy. I’m healthy. Bottom line is it's just the way you treat life and life will treat you back. Make sure you’re happy with whatever is going on in your life. I think the key of life is just be happy with what's in front of you and the decision of my life is under God and God knows what's best for me." Belfort also appeared in a testimonial video on I Am Second, in which he shares his story of his faith in Jesus Christ.

Belfort's autobiography Vitor Belfort: Lições de garra, fé e sucesso was published by Thomas Nelson Brazil in 2012.

Belfort appears in the video for the song "I'm Down" by The Almost.

On April 26, 2018, Belfort became a naturalized American citizen.

Championships and accomplishments

Mixed martial arts
 Ultimate Fighting Championship
 UFC Light Heavyweight Championship (One time)
 UFC 12 Heavyweight Tournament Championship
 Knockout of the Night (Five times)
 Performance of the Night (One time)
 2nd Most knockouts in UFC history (12)
 Most first round finishes in UFC history (13)
 Youngest UFC tournament winner (19 years, 313 days)
 Cage Rage Championships
 Cage Rage World Light heavyweight Championship (1 time)
 World MMA Awards
 2013 Knockout of the Year vs. Luke Rockhold at UFC on FX: Belfort vs. Rockhold
 Sherdog
 2013 All-Violence First Team

Submission grappling
 ADCC Submission Wrestling World Championship
 ADCC 2001 Absolute division – Bronze medal

Mixed martial arts record

|-
|Loss
|align=center|26–14 (1)
|Lyoto Machida
|KO (front kick)
|UFC 224
|
|align=center|2
|align=center|1:00
|Rio de Janeiro, Brazil
|
|-
|Win
|align=center|26–13 (1)
|Nate Marquardt
|Decision (unanimous)
|UFC 212
|
|align=center|3
|align=center|5:00
|Rio de Janeiro, Brazil
|
|-
| NC
|align=center|25–13 (1)
|Kelvin Gastelum
|NC (overturned by STJDMMA)
|UFC Fight Night: Belfort vs. Gastelum
|
|align=center|1
|align=center|3:52
|Fortaleza, Brazil
|
|-
|Loss
|align=center|25–13
|Gegard Mousasi
|TKO (punches)
|UFC 204
|
|align=center|2
|align=center|2:43
|Manchester, England
|
|-
|Loss
|align=center|25–12
|Ronaldo Souza
|TKO (punches)
|UFC 198
|
|align=center|1
|align=center|4:38
|Curitiba, Brazil
|
|-
|Win
|align=center|25–11
|Dan Henderson
|KO (punches)
|UFC Fight Night: Belfort vs. Henderson 3
|
|align=center|1
|align=center|2:07
|São Paulo, Brazil
|
|-
|Loss
|align=center|24–11
|Chris Weidman
|TKO (punches)
|UFC 187
|
|align=center|1
|align=center|2:53
|Las Vegas, Nevada, United States
|
|-
| Win
| align=center| 24–10
| Dan Henderson
| KO (head kick)
| UFC Fight Night: Belfort vs. Henderson 2
| 
| align=center| 1
| align=center| 1:17
| Goiânia, Brazil
| 
|-
| Win
| align=center| 23–10
| Luke Rockhold
| KO (spinning heel kick and punches)
| UFC on FX: Belfort vs. Rockhold
| 
| align=center| 1
| align=center| 2:32
| Jaraguá do Sul, Brazil
| 
|-
| Win
| align=center| 22–10
| Michael Bisping
| TKO (head kick and punches)
| UFC on FX: Belfort vs. Bisping
| 
| align=center| 2
| align=center| 1:27
| São Paulo, Brazil
| 
|-
| Loss
| align=center| 21–10
| Jon Jones
| Submission (keylock)
| UFC 152
| 
| align=center| 4
| align=center| 0:54
| Toronto, Ontario, Canada
| 
|-
| Win
| align=center| 21–9
| Anthony Johnson
| Submission (rear-naked choke)
| UFC 142
| 
| align=center| 1
| align=center| 4:49
| Rio de Janeiro, Brazil
| 
|-
| Win
| align=center| 20–9
| Yoshihiro Akiyama
| KO (punches)
| UFC 133
| 
| align=center| 1
| align=center| 1:52
| Philadelphia, Pennsylvania, United States
| 
|-
| Loss
| align=center| 19–9
| Anderson Silva
| KO (front kick and punches)
| UFC 126
| 
| align=center| 1
| align=center| 3:25
| Las Vegas, Nevada, United States
| 
|-
| Win
| align=center| 19–8
| Rich Franklin
| TKO (punches)
| UFC 103
| 
| align=center| 1
| align=center| 3:02
| Dallas, Texas, United States
| 
|-
| Win
| align=center| 18–8
| Matt Lindland
| KO (punches)
| Affliction: Day of Reckoning
| 
| align=center| 1
| align=center| 0:37
| Anaheim, California, United States
|
|-
| Win
| align=center| 17–8
| Terry Martin
| KO (punches)
| Affliction: Banned
| 
| align=center| 2
| align=center| 3:12
| Anaheim, California, United States
| 
|-
| Win
| align=center| 16–8
| James Zikic
| Decision (unanimous)
| Cage Rage 23
| 
| align=center| 3
| align=center| 5:00
| London, England
| 
|-
|  Win
| align=center| 15–8
| Ivan Serati
| TKO (punches)
| Cage Rage 21
| 
| align=center| 1
| align=center| 3:47
| London, England
|
|-
| Loss
| align=center| 14–8
| Dan Henderson
| Decision (unanimous)
| PRIDE 32: The Real Deal
| 
| align=center| 3
| align=center| 5:00
| Las Vegas, Nevada, United States
| 
|-
| Win
| align=center| 14–7
| Kazuo Takahashi
| KO (punch)
| PRIDE: Critical Countdown Absolute
| 
| align=center| 1
| align=center| 0:36
| Saitama, Japan
|
|-
| Loss
| align=center| 13–7
| Alistair Overeem
| Decision (unanimous)
| Strikeforce: Revenge
| 
| align=center| 3
| align=center| 5:00
| San Jose, California, United States
| 
|-
| Win
| align=center| 13–6
| Antony Rea
| KO (punches)
| Cage Rage 14
| 
| align=center| 2
| align=center| 1:14
| London, England 
|
|-
| Loss
| align=center| 12–6
| Alistair Overeem
| Submission (guillotine choke)
| PRIDE: Total Elimination 2005
| 
| align=center| 1
| align=center| 9:36
| Osaka, Japan
|
|-
| Loss
| align=center| 12–5
| Tito Ortiz
| Decision (split)
| UFC 51
| 
| align=center| 3
| align=center| 5:00
| Las Vegas, Nevada, United States
|
|-
| Loss
| align=center| 12–4
| Randy Couture
| TKO (doctor stoppage)
| UFC 49
| 
| align=center| 3
| align=center| 5:00
| Las Vegas, Nevada, United States
| 
|-
| Win
| align=center| 12–3
| Randy Couture
| TKO (doctor stoppage)
| UFC 46
| 
| align=center| 1
| align=center| 0:49
| Las Vegas, Nevada, United States
| 
|-
| Win
| align=center| 11–3
| Marvin Eastman
| TKO (knees and punches)
| UFC 43
| 
| align=center| 1
| align=center| 1:07
| Las Vegas, Nevada, United States
|
|-
| Loss
| align=center| 10–3
| Chuck Liddell
| Decision (unanimous)
| UFC 37.5
| 
| align=center| 3
| align=center| 5:00
| Las Vegas, Nevada, United States
|
|-
| Win
| align=center| 10–2
| Heath Herring
| Decision (unanimous)
| PRIDE 14: Clash of the Titans
| 
| align=center| 3
| align=center| 5:00
| Yokohama, Japan
|
|-
| Win
| align=center| 9–2
| Bobby Southworth
| Submission (rear-naked choke)
| PRIDE 13: Collision Course
| 
| align=center| 1
| align=center| 4:09
| Saitama, Japan
|
|-
| Win
| align=center| 8–2
| Daijiro Matsui
| Decision (unanimous)
| PRIDE 10: Return of the Warriors
| 
| align=center| 2
| align=center| 10:00
| Saitama, Japan
|
|-
| Win
| align=center| 7–2
| Gilbert Yvel
| Decision (unanimous)
| PRIDE 9: New Blood
| 
| align=center| 2
| align=center| 10:00
| Nagoya, Japan
|
|-
| Loss
| align=center| 6–2
| Kazushi Sakuraba
| Decision (unanimous)
| PRIDE 5
| 
| align=center| 2
| align=center| 10:00
| Nagoya, Japan
|
|-
| Win
| align=center| 6–1
| Wanderlei Silva
| TKO (punches)
| UFC Brazil
| 
| align=center| 1
| align=center| 0:44
| São Paulo, Brazil
| 
|-
| Win
| align=center| 5–1
| Joe Charles
| Submission (armbar)
| UFC Japan
| 
| align=center| 1
| align=center| 4:03
| Yokohama, Japan
|
|-
| Loss
| align=center| 4–1
| Randy Couture
| TKO (punches)
| UFC 15
| 
| align=center| 1
| align=center| 8:16
| Bay St. Louis, Mississippi, United States
| 
|-
| Win
| align=center| 4–0
| Tank Abbott
| TKO (punches)
| UFC 13
| 
| align=center| 1
| align=center| 0:52
| Augusta, Georgia, United States
|
|-
| Win
| align=center| 3–0
| Scott Ferrozzo
| TKO (punches)
| rowspan=2|UFC 12
| rowspan=2|
| align=center| 1
| align=center| 0:43
| rowspan=2|Dothan, Alabama, United States
| 
|-
| Win
| align=center| 2–0
| Tra Telligman
| TKO (cut)
| align=center| 1
| align=center| 1:17
| 
|-
| Win
| align=center| 1–0
| Jon Hess
| KO (punches)
| SuperBrawl 2
| 
| align=center| 1
| align=center| 0:12
| Honolulu, Hawaii, United States
|

Boxing record

Professional

Exhibition

Submission grappling record
KO PUNCHES
|- style="text-align:center; background:#f0f0f0;"
| style="border-style:none none solid solid; "|Result
| style="border-style:none none solid solid; "|Opponent
| style="border-style:none none solid solid; "|Method
| style="border-style:none none solid solid; "|Event
| style="border-style:none none solid solid; "|Date
| style="border-style:none none solid solid; "|Round
| style="border-style:none none solid solid; "|Time
| style="border-style:none none solid solid; "|Notes
|-
|Win|| Ricardo Almeida || Technical Submission (Injury) || ADCC 2001 Absolute Division || 2001|| || ||
|-
|Loss|| Ricardo Arona || Points || ADCC 2001 Absolute || 2001|| || ||
|-
|Win|| Ricco Rodriguez || Points || ADCC 2001 Absolute || 2001|| || ||
|-
|Win|| Genki Sudo || Points || ADCC 2001 Absolute || 2001|| || ||
|-
|Loss|| Mark Robinson || Points || ADCC 2001 +99 kg || 2001|| || ||
|-
|Win|| Hiroki Fukuda || Submission (Rear-Naked Choke) || ADCC 2001 +99 kg || 2001|| || ||
|-

See also
 List of male mixed martial artists

References

External links

 Official Website
 
 
 IMDB Profile

1977 births
Living people
Brazilian male mixed martial artists
Brazilian Christians
Brazilian male judoka
Brazilian male karateka
Brazilian practitioners of Brazilian jiu-jitsu
Brazilian submission wrestlers
Mixed martial artists utilizing Brazilian jiu-jitsu
Mixed martial artists utilizing judo
Mixed martial artists utilizing Shotokan
Mixed martial artists utilizing boxing
Brazilian people of French descent
Brazilian people of Greek descent
Heavyweight mixed martial artists
Light heavyweight mixed martial artists
Middleweight mixed martial artists
Sportspeople from Rio de Janeiro (city)
Brazilian expatriate sportspeople in the United States
Ultimate Fighting Championship male fighters
Ultimate Fighting Championship champions
Brazilian sportspeople in doping cases
Doping cases in mixed martial arts
People awarded a black belt in Brazilian jiu-jitsu
Brazilian male boxers